The 217 Omari Corps is one of the eight corps of the Islamic Emirate Army established in October 2021 and headquartered in Kunduz. The current Chief of Staff is Mohammad Shafiq. The corps includes Kunduz brigade, Baghlan brigade, Takhar brigade and Badakhshan brigade.

The Islamic Republic of Afghanistan-era corps it replaced was known as the 217th 'Pamir' Corps and was a part of Afghan National Army.

Commands

Brigades

217th 'Pamir' Corps 

The 217th 'Pamir' Corps was one of the Corps of the Afghan National Army. Its headquarters was in Kunduz, Kunduz province. The Corps was established in 2019 in northeast of Afghanistan and Gen. Nabiullah Mirzayi was appointed as its first commander.

The Corps was established to improve the security situation in northeastern region of Afghanistan. However, the military experts expressed skepticism regarding the ability of the Corps to help improve the security in the northeastern parts of the country. In 2019, the Corps had two brigades according to officials from Afghanistan’s Ministry of Defense.

The last commander of the Corps was Muhammad Ali Yazdani who had assumed the command of the Corps in 2020. During the Taliban offensive in 2021, the Corps resisted Taliban attacks on Kunduz for more than a month and later surrendered in Kunduz on 11 August 2021.

References

Military units and formations established in 2021
Corps of the Islamic Emirate Army